Sarghulami is a extinct Iranian language formerly spoken in Afghanisan's Badakhshan in the village of Sarghulam.  It was recorded by Russian professor Ivan Zarubin in the 1920's, though many linguists doubt that the language even existed.  Zarubin said it was spoken in a valley east of Fayzabad and collected a few words, though it may be referring to the village of Sarghulam.  It is thought to be part of the Munji-Yidgha branch of the Pamir language, though many Pashto words have been noted in the language.

References 

Extinct languages
Iranian languages